WAKI is a sports formatted broadcast radio station licensed to McMinnville, Tennessee, serving McMinnville and Warren County, Tennessee.  WAKI is owned and operated by Peg Broadcasting, Inc.

External links
 1230 WAKI Sports Radio Online
 
 
 

AKI
ESPN Radio stations
Radio stations established in 1947
1947 establishments in Tennessee